Antonio Benítez-Rojo (March 14, 1931 – January 5, 2005) was a Cuban novelist, essayist and short-story writer.  He was widely regarded as the most significant Cuban author of his generation.  His work has been translated into nine languages and collected in more than 50 anthologies.

Life 
Born in Havana, he lived in Cuba with his mother and stepfather from the age of seven.  In the mid-1950s, backed by United Nations grants, Benítez-Rojo studied statistics at the United States Department of Labor and Commerce, and later studied in Mexico. Turning down offers to work in Chile or Geneva, he returned to Cuba in 1958 and became head of the Statistics Bureau at Cuba's Labor Ministry.

Benítez-Rojo began working at the Ministry of Culture in 1965 and won the Premio Casa de las Américas for the short story collection Tute de reyes in 1967. The following year, he won a writers' union prize of a trip to a socialist country; however, the government did not permit him to leave Cuba.

By 1975, Benítez-Rojo had been made head of Casa de las Américas, the publishing house run by the Cuban government.  Sea of Lentils, the English translation of his novel El mar de las lentejas, was selected by The New York Times as one of the Notable Books of 1992.  In 1980, he was given permission to attend a conference at the Sorbonne in Paris. He traveled from Paris to Berlin, obtained a US tourist visa, and came to the United States, where he became a professor of Spanish at Amherst. The Archives and Special Collections at Amherst College holds a collection of his papers.

One of his most influential publications, La Isla que se Repite, was published in 1989 by Ediciones del Norte.  He died in 2005, aged 73.

List of works
Tute de Reyes, 1967
El escudo de hojas secas, 1969
Los inquilinos 1976
Heroica, 1977
El mar de las lentejas (The Sea of Lentils), 1979
"La isla que se repite: El Caribe y la perspectiva posmoderna", 1989 (first introduced in English as an essay, translated by James Maraniss and published as "The Repeating Island" (New England Review and Bread Loaf Quarterly, v. VII, n. 4, Summer 1985) then republished in book form as The Repeating Island: The Caribbean and the Postmodern Perspective (Duke University Press, 1992; second edition 1996).
Antología Personal (Personal Anthology), 1997
Mujer en traje de batalla (Women in Battle Dress), 2001
 Woman in Battle Dress—Translated from the Spanish by Jessica Powell (City Lights, 2015)
 A View from the Mangrove (short stories, translated by James Maraniss, published under the Faber Caribbean Series imprint in 1998)

See also 

 Caribbean literature
 Caribbean poetry
 Postcolonial literature

References

External links
Antonio Benitez Rojo Papers, Amherst College Archives and Special Collections
Antonio Benítez Rojo Papers, Princeton University Library, Special Collections

1931 births
2005 deaths
Latin Americanists
Cuban emigrants to the United States
Amherst College faculty
Cuban male novelists
Cuban male short story writers
Cuban short story writers
Cuban essayists
Male essayists
20th-century Cuban novelists
20th-century short story writers
20th-century essayists
20th-century male writers